Doko is a kind of basket made from bamboo. They are hand-woven in a conical or "V" shape. Dokos are especially used by porters to carry goods in Nepal, Bhutan and northern India's mountainous Sikkim and Uttarakhand states.

Material
Dokos are made from dry bamboo strips. Bamboo is durable and withstands harsh weather. It also uses clothespins and scissors in the making.

Uses

Dokos are typically 0.1 to 0.2 m3 in volume, so an average person can carry 20-50kg. They have shoulder straps, and usually head straps called namlo that take part of the load off the carrier's shoulders.

Dokos are used to carry goods, vegetables, grains, water pots, etc. They are also used to carry small animals and poultry, as well as serving as temporary cages for animals.  Where there are no motor roads, special oversized dokos are used to transport people unable to walk. Doko production has been a good source of income as well. Blind people are trained for doko production to earn their livelihood in Nepal. In almost every rural area of Nepal the doko is utilized as a common tool for carrying heavy loads.

References

Containers
Nepalese culture